Ibn Amira(1186- 1258/60), full name: Abū al-Muṭarrif Aḥmad bin Abdallāh bin al-Ḥusayn bin Aḥmad Ibn Amīra al-Makhzūmī was a historian, poet, and scholar of law from al-Andalus during the reign of the Almohad Caliphate. Ibn Amira was Qadi of Mallorca and worked for the Almohad sultan in Valencia and Seville. He moved to Morocco in 1239/40 (after the fall of Valencia in 1238) and continued to work for the sultan there.

Biography 
Ibn Amira al-Makhzumi was born at Alzira in the province of Valencia, Spain. He was born into a well-known Berber family established in al-Andalus, in Shatiba (now Xàtiva, Valencia), by the eleventh century. He started his studies in Alzira and focused on hadith, fiqh (Islamic jurisprudence), and literature. He was taught by some of the most famous scholars of his day, such as the traditionist Abu l-Rabi Ibn Salim and the grammarian al-Shalawbin.

Works 
The theme of paradise lost (al-firdaws al-mafqud) was expressed by the Valencian exile in his 'Letter to a Friend'. This friend was the poet Ibn al-Abbar. "An ocean of sadness rages inside us, Our hearts, desperate, burn with eternal flames. The city was so beautiful with its gardens and rivers, The nights were imbued with the sweet fragrance of narcissus."

Ibn Amira was also the author of a manuscript about the history of Mallorca, Tarij Mayurqa. The manuscript (written between 1203 and 1232) was translated into Spanish by the historian Guillem Rosselló Bordoy.

References

Sources 

Manuel Boix and Josep Palàcios: Ali b. Atiyya Ibn al-Zaqqaq, Ahmad b. Abd Allah Ibn Amira, Ibrahim b. Abi l-Fath Ibn Hafaya Alzira, Valencia, Bromera, 1988. 

1186 births
1250s deaths
13th-century Berber people
Berber historians
Berber poets
Berber writers
Maliki scholars from al-Andalus
13th-century writers from al-Andalus
Oriental islands of Al-Andalus
People from the Almohad Caliphate
Poets from al-Andalus
13th-century historians from al-Andalus